Upton Pyne is a parish and village in Devon, England. The parish lies just north west of Exeter, mainly between the River Exe and River Creedy. The village is located north of Cowley and west of Brampford Speke and Stoke Canon. It has a population of 539.

History

The manor came into the possession of the Pyne family during the reign of Henry I (1100–1135) when Herbert de Pins (or de pyn) took over the land.

The Pyne family held it for ten successive generations, until Constance Pyne married William Larder about the end of the 15th century. The Larders held the manor for five generations.

In the early 18th century the heiress of Stafford of Pynes married her neighbour Sir Henry Northcote (5th baronet) and took the manor to him.  Sir Henry probably built the present Pynes House, a typical Queen Anne house, enlarged in 1851.

The Pyne family also gave their name to the villages of Culm Pyne and Washford Pyne. One branch of the family moved to  Ireland in the time of Elizabeth I, and acquired substantial estates at Mogeely in County Cork. Sir Richard Pyne (1644-1709), Lord Chief Justice of Ireland, was a member of this branch of the family. Pynes House is now used as an events venue, primarily for weddings.

The church
St Mary's church is built of the local volcanic stone, and has a particularly beautiful tower, with figures of the four evangelists at its corners and that of Christ in Benediction on its West face.

The chancel has some early 14th century work; the West tower and South aisle were probably added about 1400, the North aisle in 1833.

The altar-piece is a painting of the Last Supper by an unknown hand, brought from Italy by one of the Northcotes about 1710. There is an altar-tomb to Humphrey Larder (d. 1588), another with a recumbent effigy of Edmund Larder (d. 1521), and several monuments to the Northcotes of Pynes, later Earls of Iddesleigh.

John Walker, author of The Sufferings of the Clergy, was rector here 1720-47, and is buried on the N. side of the churchyard.

No Man's Chapel
There is a stone on the Upton Pyne road recording that the ancient chapel of St John the Baptist was situated here until its removal to Crediton Cemetery in 1926.

Largely paid for by Sir John Shelley, Lord of the Manor of East Raddon, but with much support in the provision of labour, fixtures and furnishings by local parishioners, "St John's Baptist's Chantry was brought back to its original uses" as the Rural Dean noted as the chapel was re-dedicated in October 1896.

There are regular references to events at the chapel during the 1890s and 1900s, but it seems to have fallen out of use after that. The chapel was therefore available for relocation when Crediton Cemetery was established in the 1920s.

The name 'No Man's Chapel' comes from the conversion of an earlier chapel on the same site into a dwelling house by farmer George Painter. This earlier chapel appears on rent lists for the Manor of East Raddon dating back to the 1740s. It is said that this chapel dated back to the 14th century, although there is no evidence for this.

See also
 Upton Pyne apple

References

Sources
 (Google Maps)

External links

Villages in Devon
Former manors in Devon